Robert David Kaplan (born June 23, 1952) is an American author. His books are on politics, primarily foreign affairs, and travel. His work over three decades has appeared in The Atlantic, The Washington Post, The New York Times, The New Republic, The National Interest, Foreign Affairs and The Wall Street Journal, among other newspapers and publications.

One of Kaplan's most influential articles is "The Coming Anarchy", published in The Atlantic Monthly in 1994. Critics of the article have compared it to Huntington's Clash of Civilizations thesis, since Kaplan presents conflicts in the contemporary world as the struggle between primitivism and civilizations. Another frequent theme in Kaplan's work is the reemergence of cultural and historical tensions temporarily suspended during the Cold War.

From 2008 to 2012, Kaplan was a Senior Fellow at the Center for a New American Security in Washington, DC; he rejoined the organization in 2015. Between 2012 and 2014, he was chief geopolitical analyst at Stratfor, a private global forecasting firm. In 2009, Secretary of Defense Robert Gates appointed Kaplan to the Defense Policy Board, a federal advisory committee to the United States Department of Defense. In 2011, and 2012, Foreign Policy magazine named Kaplan as one of the world's "top 100 global thinkers". In 2017, Kaplan joined Eurasia Group, a political risk consultancy, as a senior advisor. In 2020, he was named to the Robert Strausz-Hupé Chair in Geopolitics at the Foreign Policy Research Institute in Philadelphia.

Early life and career
Kaplan grew up in Far Rockaway in a Jewish family, son of Philip Alexander Kaplan and Phyllis Quasha. Kaplan's father, a truck driver for the New York Daily News, instilled in him an interest in history from an early age. He attended the University of Connecticut on a swimming scholarship, taking newswriting classes with Evan Hill, and earned a BA in English in 1973. He has one sibling, an older brother, Stephen Kaplan.

After graduating, Kaplan applied unsuccessfully to several big-city newsrooms. He was a reporter for the Rutland Herald in Vermont before buying a one-way plane ticket to Tunisia. Over the next several years, he lived in Israel, where he joined the Israeli army, traveled and reported on Eastern Europe and the Middle East, lived for some time in Portugal and eventually settled down in Athens, Greece, where he met his wife. He lives with his wife in Massachusetts.

Kaplan is not related to journalist Lawrence Kaplan, with whom he is occasionally confused. He is also sometimes confused with neoconservative scholar Robert Kagan.

In addition to his journalism, Kaplan has been a consultant to the U.S. Army's Special Forces, the United States Marines, and the United States Air Force. He has lectured at military war colleges, the FBI, the National Security Agency, the Pentagon's Joint Chiefs of Staff, major universities, the CIA, and business forums, and has appeared on PBS, NPR, C-SPAN, and Fox News. He is a senior fellow at the Foreign Policy Research Institute. In 2001, he briefed President Bush. He is the recipient of the 2001 Greenway-Winship Award for Excellence in international reporting. In 2002, he was awarded the United States State Department Distinguished Public Service Award. Kaplan is the recipient of the International Award for 2016 from the Sociedad Geografica Espanola in Madrid, presented by Queen Sofia of Spain.

In 2006–08, Kaplan was a visiting professor at the United States Naval Academy, Annapolis, where he taught a course entitled, "Future Global Security Challenges". As of 2008 he is a senior fellow at the Center for a New American Security.

Foreign correspondent career
He traveled to Iraq to cover the Iran–Iraq War (1984). He first worked as a freelance foreign correspondent reporting on Eastern Europe and the Middle East, but slowly expanded his coverage to all regions ignored in the popular press. His first book, Surrender or Starve: The Wars Behind The Famine (1988) contended the famine in Ethiopia in the 1980s was more complex than just drought, pointing the blame instead to the collectivization carried out by the Mengistu regime.

Kaplan then went to Afghanistan to write about the guerrilla war against the Soviet Union for Reader's Digest. Two years after writing Surrender or Starve, he wrote and published Soldiers of God: With the Mujahidin in Afghanistan (1990) in which he recounted his experiences during the Soviet–Afghan War.

Balkan Ghosts and The Arabists
Kaplan's third book, Balkan Ghosts, was rejected by several editors before being published in 1993. At first, it did not sell very well. After the Yugoslav Wars broke out, President Bill Clinton was seen with Kaplan's book tucked under his arm, and White House insiders and aides said that the book convinced the President against intervention in Bosnia. Kaplan's book contended that the conflicts in the Balkans were based on ancient hatreds beyond any outside control. Kaplan criticized the administration for using the book to justify non-intervention, but his popularity skyrocketed shortly thereafter along with demand for his reporting. That same year, he also published The Arabists.

Kaplan had not set out to influence U.S. foreign policy, but his work began to find a wide readership in high levels of government. In 1994 and 1995, he set out to travel from West Africa to Turkey, Central Asia to Iran, and India to Southeast Asia and published a travelogue about his journey in The Ends of the Earth. He then traveled across his home country and North America and wrote An Empire Wilderness, published in 1998.

"The Coming Anarchy"

His article "The Coming Anarchy" published in The Atlantic in February 1994 about how population increase, urbanization, and resource depletion are undermining fragile governments across the developing world and represent a threat to the developed world was hotly debated and widely translated. 
Kaplan published the article and other essays in a book with the same title in 2000, which also included the controversial article '"Was Democracy Just a Moment?" His travels through the Balkans, Turkey, the Caucasus, and the Middle East at the turn of the millennium were recorded in Eastward to Tartary.

Writing in The New York Times, reviewer Richard Bernstein noted that Kaplan "conveys a historically informed tragic sense in recognizing humankind's tendency toward a kind of slipshod, gooey, utopian and ultimately dangerous optimism."

After 9/11

Demand for Kaplan's unorthodox analysis became more acute after the September 11, 2001 attacks on New York City and Washington, D.C. In his book, Warrior Politics: Why Leadership Demands a Pagan Ethos, published shortly after 9/11, Kaplan offered the opinion that political and business leaders should discard Christian/Jewish morality in public decision-making in favor of a pagan morality focused on the morality of the result rather than the morality of the means. He also published a pure travel book titled Mediterranean Winter.

Support for the Iraq War
Kaplan, along with Fareed Zakaria of Newsweek, has been described by American journalist Glenn Greenwald as one of many prominent pundits advocating support for the Iraq War.

Kaplan participated in a secret meeting convened by the then Deputy Secretary of Defense Paul D. Wolfowitz, at which he helped draft an internal government document advocating the invasion of Iraq. He later concluded that the war had been a mistake and expressed deep remorse for supporting it.

Criticism of President Donald Trump
Although Kaplan expresses sympathy for the many white blue collar voters who chose U.S. President Donald Trump in the 2016 election, in the book Earning the Rockies, Kaplan has also been critical of Donald Trump on foreign policy and national security. Kaplan has argued that Trump's defense and foreign policy rely too heavily on military spending, calling it "American Caesarism". Kaplan has drawn parallels between Trump's focus on a militaristic image and large reductions to "soft" non-military foreign policy efforts with the gradual decline of the Roman Empire as a result of similar excess. Kaplan sees Trump's spending plans for national security and foreign policy as the first stage of a "tragic decline" for the United States.
On foreign policy more broadly, Kaplan has called Donald J. Trump "a terrible messenger for realism" who "appears to have no sense of history".

Imperial Grunts

Kaplan's book Imperial Grunts: The American Military On The Ground, was published in October 2005. In it, Kaplan tells of US Special Forces on the ground across the globe in Colombia, Mongolia, the Philippines, Afghanistan and Iraq. Kaplan predicts that the age of mass infantry warfare is probably over and has said that the conflict in Iraq caught the US Army in between being a "dinosaur" and a "light and lethal force of the future." Kaplan reports that many soldiers view certain parts of the world where they are operating as "Injun Country," which must be civilized by the same methods used to subdue the American Frontier in the 1800s.

He also analyzes the revival of Confederate military virtue in the US armed forces. Kaplan was embedded with U.S. troops in Iraq and wrote an often-cited report for The Atlantic entitled "Five Days in Fallujah" about the spring 2004 campaign. In June 2005, he wrote the cover story for The Atlantic titled "How We Would Fight China", which suggests the inevitability of a Cold War-type situation between the US and China. In October 2006, he wrote "When North Korea Falls" for the same magazine in which he examines the prospect of North Korea's collapse and the effect on the balance of power in Asia in favor of China.

Hog Pilots

Kaplan's book Hog Pilots, Blue Water Grunts: The American Military in the Air, at Sea, and on the Ground, published in September 2007 by Random House, reflects his continuing interest in the US Armed Forces.

Monsoon

Monsoon: The Indian Ocean and the Future of American Power (2010) is about the Indian Ocean region and the future of energy supplies and maritime trade routes in the 21st century. He claimed that the Indian Ocean has been a center of power for a long time and that the shift to the Atlantic can be seen as an anomaly which will be set straight in future years. For the United States to maintain its power, it would have to link its goals with those of the people of the developing world, he concluded.

The Revenge of Geography

The Revenge of Geography: What the Map Tells Us About Coming Conflicts and the Battle Against Fate (2012) describes how countries' respective political and social histories have been shaped by factors like relationship to the ocean and to terrain features that act as natural borders. The book also focuses on how demographic shifts in countries will affect them in the future.

Asia's Cauldron

Asia's Cauldron (2014) describes the modern (from the colonial era to the present) cultural and political history of the various countries of Southeast Asia (such as Singapore, Vietnam and the Philippines) and the region's geopolitical significance to China, as well as those states' resultant anxiety over Chinese maritime territorial claims in the region.

In Europe's Shadow

In Europe's Shadow (2016) is one of Kaplan's most personal examinations of the influence of geography and civilization on politics and history. Informed by his travels to the Balkans since the 1970s, Kaplan links Romania's contemporary political and social reality to its complex identity and history. While the book echoes many of Kaplan's earlier historical travelogues, it looks ahead to the challenges Europe will face by examining Romania as a microcosm of Europe's coming geopolitical crises.

The Return of Marco Polo's World
The Return of Marco Polo's World: War, Strategy, and American Interests in the Twenty-first Century (2018) is a collection of Kaplan's post-2000 essays on the evolving system in Eurasia. Commissioned by the Pentagon's Office of Net Assessment, the book's lead essay draws parallels between Eurasia's contemporary emergence as a single "battlespace" to its 13th century geopolitics, when China last constructed a land bridge to Europe. The book's other essays, published over the years in a range of analytical and journalistic sources, delve into themes such as technology, globalization, and the misguided application of military power. Together, they paint a portrait of American influence and European cohesion on the decline in the face of a rapidly emergent new order in Eurasia.

The Good American: The Epic Life of Bob Gersony, The U.S. Government's Greatest Humanitarian
 
Published in January, 2021, The Good American is a biography of Robert Gersony, a human rights worker in crisis zones around Africa, Latin America, and Asia during the Cold War and Post Cold War.

Adriatic: A Concert of Civilizations at the End of the Modern Age
Kaplan's most recent book (April, 2022) is a travelogue that explores the history and culture of the countries around the Adriatic Sea.

The Tragic Mind: Fear, Fate, and the Burden of Power
Kaplan's upcoming book (January, 2023) is focused on connecting the concept of tragedy with politics. Kaplan will narrow in on his personal experiences from his travels across the world and connect them with current international relations.

Influences
Kaplan is a stated admirer of the work of John Mearsheimer, a University of Chicago-based Realist political scientist whom Kaplan's books occasionally cite. Moreover, Kaplan's predictions in The Coming Anarchy dovetail in part with Mearsheimer's predictions for the future of Post-Cold War Europe. Kaplan's stance on Mearsheimer's work is addressed in an essay in The Atlantic, titled "Why John J. Mearsheimer is right (about some things)". The essay was written largely in response to Mearsheimer's stance in his controversial 2007 book The Israel Lobby and U.S. Foreign Policy, which was negatively received and described as an anti-Israel polemic by several reviewers. In the same essay, Kaplan defends the theory of offensive realism advocated by John Mearsheimer from claims that it necessarily advocates hawkish or neoconservative foreign policy.

Additionally, Kaplan draws on the classical realism of Hans Morgenthau. He also frequently refers to the geographer Halford Mackinder and his once-influential Heartland theory, along with the theories of Nicholas Spykman and Alfred Thayer Mahan.

Criticisms and controversy

Kaplan's arguments have been criticised on various grounds. Some of his more controversial articles, such as "The Ruins of Empire in the Middle East" and "In Defense of Empire", have been criticized for alluding to empires, and, implicitly, imperialism, as a prosperous, stabilizing force and a net positive for humanity.

Political geographer Nick Megoran argues that "for geographers, Kaplan's article [The Revenge of Geography] makes dismal reading". The article, in Megoran's view, takes theories of classical geopolitical scholars like Halford Mackinder out of their socio-historical context. Kaplan's writing contributes to an "unwelcome return" to what Megoran loosely perceives as militarist-imperialist discourses in traditional geopolitics. This study and approach, due to its historical associations, is considered a discredited field amongst academic geographers, but Megoran objects to its influence on Kaplan and on the foreign policy of states. However, this view fails to take into account the role that the study of classical geopolitics and military geography may play in the prevention and mitigation of conflict over territorial space.

Environmental determinism 
Late academic geographer Harm de Blij has criticized Kaplan's book The Revenge of Geography for tending toward what de Blij interprets as environmental determinism, a school of thought often regarded as a discredited paradigm by geographers. He also argues that the book lacks acknowledgment of thinkers associated with postmodern schools of geographic thought, such as critical geopolitics. Finally, he describes Kaplan's book The Revenge of Geography as one of several "misleading" books on geography by non-formally trained geographers, and as such misrepresents the field to those unfamiliar (other examples that de Blij alludes to include Thomas Friedman's The World Is Flat and Jared Diamond's Guns, Germs, and Steel).

Orientalism
Dag Tuastad, senior lecturer of Middle East and Africa at the University of Oslo, claims that Kaplan, "like Huntington (author of Clash of Civilizations), perpetuates a neo-Orientalist sentiment, namely, emphasizing 'features innately embedded in the Muslim religion, including the provision that Islam is a religion of the sword and a religion that glorifies military virtues'".

Istvan Deak, Columbia University Professor Emeritus of History, labels Balkan Ghosts "an often delightful romp through the past and present politics of a region," saying that Kaplan "intends to convince us, and he assuredly does, with gusto, that the peoples of these five alienated countries do indeed form an unhappy whole."

Recognition
In 2012, Kaplan was named by Foreign Policy magazine on its list of top global thinkers.

Bibliography
  
 
 
  
 , published August 1998 
 , published January 2000 
 , published February 1996, republished January 2000 
  (also titled Soldiers of God: With Islamic Warriors in Afghanistan and Pakistan), published February 1990, reprinted November 2001 
 , published September 1988, reprinted November 2003 
 , published February 1993, reprinted March 1994 
 , published November 2000 
 , published December 2001 
  
 , published February 2004 
 , published September 2005 
 , published September 2007 
 , published October 2010 
 , published September 2012 
 , published March 2014
 , published February 2016 
   
Robert D. Kaplan (March 20, 2018). The Return of Marco Polo's World: War, Strategy and American Interests in the Twenty-First Century. Random House. ., published March 2018
Robert D. Kaplan (April 12, 2022). Adriatic: A Concert of Civilizations at the End of the Modern Age. Random House. ., published April 2022

Contributions to other books

  
 , published April 2000 (Introduction, Modern Library 1400061334Edition) 
 , published September 2002 (Contributor) 
 , published April 2003 (Introduction, Modern Library Edition) (Introduction)

Magazine articles

How Islam Created Europe, The Atlantic, May 2016
The Art of Avoiding War, The Atlantic, June 2015
Confronting China. ‘The National Interest’, July/August 2019.

See also
 Ralph Peters
 Pax Americana
 American Imperialism
 Geopolitics

References

External links

1952 births
Living people
Writers from Queens, New York
American expatriates in Greece
American expatriates in Israel
American expatriates in Portugal
American foreign policy writers
American male non-fiction writers
American travel writers
The Atlantic (magazine) people
Center for a New American Security
Foreign Policy Research Institute
Israeli soldiers
Jewish American writers

Political realists
United States Naval Academy faculty
University of Connecticut alumni
21st-century American Jews